1989 IFMAR 1:10 Electric Off-Road World Championships was the third edition of the 1:10 Electric Off-Road World Championship that took place in Australia at the St Ives Showground in Sydney between the 4th and 10th September 1989.

Classification
Note: A-main only.

2WD

4WD

References

Bibliography

 [cutout of a Japanese magazine, unverified by website owner] 

 [cutout of a Japanese magazine, unverified by website owner]
 [cutout of a Japanese magazine, unverified by website owner]

Further reading

 [cutout of a Japanese magazine, unverified by website owner] 

IFMAR 1:10 Electric Off-Road World Championship
International sports competitions hosted by Australia